Lieutenant Colonel Wisnu Airfield also referred to as Buleleng Airport is located in Sumberkima, Buleleng Regency, Bali, Indonesia. Construction was funded by the local government and completed in 2007. Airfield runway are planned to be extended from 600 to 1200 meters by 2010.

Airfield information 
Short-field landing recommended for RWY 14. Obstacles (trees, houses, mosque) surrounding airfield from the north and high terrain elevation from the south. Airfield is used by a local flight academy, causing constant departures and arrivals of Cessna 172s, some of which are piloted by solo students. Information service is attended erratically. This airport is usually used for mutual cross-country flights to east Bali and back. The airport's frequency is 122.55 and the airport's call sign is "Wisnu Info". The Airport is generally open from Monday to Saturday around the times 00:00-09:00 UTC.

External links 
 Bali Int. Flight Academy
 Bali Int. Airport Official Website

Buleleng Regency
Airports in Bali